Kremser SC is an Austrian association football club located in Krems, Austria. It currently plays in 1. Niederösterreichische Landesliga. The team's colors are white and black.

They last played at the country's highest level during the 1991–92 Austrian Football Bundesliga season.

External links
Official website

Football clubs in Austria
Association football clubs established in 1919
Krems an der Donau
1919 establishments in Austria